Paul Jacob Reiss (born 1930) was the 14th president of Saint Michael's College. During his tenure, 80 percent of the College's facilities were newly built or renovated, and there was extensive computerization on campus. In 1989, he was an American representative at the Vatican consultation that led to Ex corde Ecclesiae.

Having earned a B.S., magna cum laude, from the College of the Holy Cross, an M.A. in sociology from Fordham University in 1954, and a PhD from Harvard University, Reiss taught at Marquette University (1957–1963) and then at Fordham (1963–1985). From 1969 until he left Fordham to become President of Saint Michael's (from which he retired as President Emeritus in 1996) he worked in administration as Dean, Vice President, and Executive Vice President.

Reiss was named Vermont Distinguished citizen of the year in 1996 and was awarded honorary degrees by Middlebury College and Showa University of Japan.
Reiss's published works in sociology are primarily concerned with family, kinship, higher education, and moral values in Catholic education. Since the 1960s, Reiss and his wife Rosemary have tenaciously and successfully overseen the mission of a foundation established by his father Julian to operate summer camps for underserved children from New York City that focus on academics, leadership and recreation in Lake Placid, NY.

Reiss finished his book titled Dad in 2000. The memoir contains stories about his family, mostly referring to the accomplishments of his ancestors.

After his retirement from St Michael's College, Reiss served several years as President of the Lake Placid Sinfonietta and as the founding Chairman of Mercy Care for the Adirondacks. Reiss has been married to the former Rosemary A. Donohue for over 60 years.  They have nine children, 30 grandchildren and nine great-grandchildren.

References 

1930 births
Living people
Fordham University alumni
Harvard University alumni
Saint Michael's College
College of the Holy Cross alumni
Heads of universities and colleges in the United States
Roman Catholic scholars